Megan Moulton-Levy (born March 11, 1985) is a Jamaican-American former professional tennis player. Her career-high singles ranking is world No. 237, which she reached on 6 July 2009. Her career-high WTA doubles ranking is 50, achieved on 22 July 2013.

Early life
Her mother is Dr. Paulette Moulton, a dermatologist, and her father is Dr. George Levy, a record-setting sprinter at Nebraska who competed in the 1972 Munich Olympics in the 100m and 4x100m, and who is now an ear, nose and throat doctor. She was born in Grosse Pointe, Michigan, and has three sisters.

College
Moulton-Levy went to Aiglon College, an international boarding school in Switzerland. She played at the College of William & Mary in Williamsburg, Virginia from 2004 to 2008. She was a four-time Colonial Athletic Association (CAA) Women's Tennis Player of the Year; this four-time player of the year selection marked her as only the second athlete, regardless of sport or gender, to ever sweep such an award in the CAA's history. Her three selections as the CAA Tournament MVP are also the most ever. Moulton-Levy was also a six-time All-American who reached the semifinals of the 2006 NCAA Singles Championship and the finals of the 2007 NCAA Doubles Championship. Finally, she twice received the National ITA/Arthur Ashe, Jr. Award for Leadership and Sportsmanship. She also won the most combined singles and doubles matches in school history (249).

WTA career finals

Doubles: 1 title

ITF finals

Singles: 2 (1–1)

Doubles 22 (10–12)

Grand Slam performance timelines

Doubles

References

External links

 
 
 Megan Moulton-Levy – official website
 CAA Silver Anniversary Selection
 Twitter

1985 births
Living people
Lesbian sportswomen
American LGBT sportspeople
LGBT tennis players
American female tennis players
Jamaican female tennis players
People from Monroe, Michigan
Tennis people from Michigan
LGBT people from Michigan
William & Mary Tribe women's tennis players
Jamaican sportswomen
Alumni of Aiglon College